Midland Independent School District is a public school district in Midland, Texas. Midland ISD contains 40 campuses, two 6A high schools, 24 elementary schools, and two early education centers.

It includes the portions of Midland and Odessa in Midland County.

Led by Superintendent of Schools Dr. Stephenie D. Howard, over 26,000 students are spread out amongst the various campuses.

In 2014-2015, the school district was rated "academically acceptable" by the Texas Education Agency.

Schools

Secondary schools

High schools
 Legacy High School (10-12) and Legacy Freshman High School (9)
 Midland High School (10-12) and Midland Freshman High School (9)
 Early College High School at Midland College (9-12) (magnet school)
 Viola M. Coleman High School (9-12) (Alternative school)

Freshman High Schools
 Legacy Freshman High School
 Midland Freshman

Junior high schools
 George & Gladys Abell Junior High School
 Alamo Junior High School
 Charles Walter Goddard Junior High School
 San Jacinto Junior High School
 Young Women's Leadership Academy

Elementary schools

 James Bonham Elementary School
 David Burnet Elementary School
 George H. W. Bush Elementary School
 The school opened in 1989.  it has 460 students.
 George Washington Carver Elementary School (for students tested as Gifted & Talented)
 David Crockett Elementary School
 Lorenzo DeZavala Elementary School
 Ralph Waldo Emerson Elementary School
 James Walker Fannin Elementary School
 Fasken Elementary School
 Barney R. Greathouse Elementary School
 James Henderson Elementary School
 Sam Houston Elementary School
 Anson Jones Elementary School
 Mirabeau Lamar Elementary School
 Jane Long Elementary School
 Benjamin Milam Elementary School
 Quanah Parker Elementary School
 Thomas Rusk Elementary School
 Santa Rita Elementary School
 Ruth Cowden Scharbauer Elementary School
 South Elementary School
 William Travis Elementary School
 Booker T. Washington Elementary School
 Barbara B Yarbrough Elementary School

Elementary Magnet Schools
 James Bowie Fine Arts Academy
 Elisha Pease Communications/Technology Elementary Magnet School
 George Washington Math & Science Institute

Early Childhood Schools
 Ralph Bunche Early Childhood

Defunct Schools
 George Washington Carver Junior-Senior High School
 William Cowden Junior High School
 West Early Childhood

See also

List of school districts in Texas

References

External links
 

 
Education in Midland County, Texas
Odessa, Texas
Midland, Texas
School districts in Texas